Donald Bruce House, also known as Middlepen Plantation, is a historic plantation home located near Orangeburg, Orangeburg County, South Carolina. It was originally built during the 18th century in downtown Orangeburg and was moved to Middlepen Plantation about 1837. The house is a two-story frame structure with a two-tiered front piazza.  It was used as headquarters during the American Revolution at different times by both Governor John Rutledge and by the British commander, Lord Francis Rawdon.

It was added to the National Register of Historic Places in 1978. The house is not open to public tours.

References

Plantation houses in South Carolina
Houses on the National Register of Historic Places in South Carolina
Houses completed in 1837
Houses in Orangeburg County, South Carolina
National Register of Historic Places in Orangeburg County, South Carolina